The Gardno-class (Project 207) is a class of minesweepers in service with the Polish Navy. The ships are in commission since 1984.

Ships in class 

 ORP Gardno
 ORP Bukowo
 ORP Dąbie
 ORP Jamno
 ORP Mielno
 ORP Wicko
 ORP Resko
 ORP Sarbsko
 ORP Necko
 ORP Nakło
 ORP Drużno
 ORP Hańcza

References

Mine warfare vessels of Poland